Indian Airlines Flight 440 was a flight on 31 May 1973 that crashed while on approach to Palam Airport (now Indira Gandhi International Airport) killing 48 of the 65 passengers and crew on board.

Accident
Flight 440 was a scheduled domestic passenger flight from Madras (now Chennai), Tamil Nadu to New Delhi. A Boeing 737 named Saranga was used for the flight. As Flight 440 approached Palam International Airport in driving dust and a rainstorm, the aircraft struck high tension wires during a NDB approach with visibility below minimal. The aircraft crashed and caught fire. 48 of the 65 passengers and crew on board Flight 440 perished in the accident. Rescue officials said the survivors were in the front of the aircraft, although one survivor reported sitting in the back row.

The survivors included three Americans and two Japanese. The dead included four Americans, three people from the United Kingdom, and one woman from Yemen. Among the dead was Indian Minister of Iron and Steel Mines, Mohan Kumaramangalam, Member of Parliament, Lok Sabha and Communist Party of India politician K. Baladhandayutham and former Member of Parliament, Rajya Sabha and Indian National Congress politician Devaki Gopidas and businessman Raghunath Kakani Reddy.

Cause
Investigators determined the Indian Airlines Flight 440 crash was caused by the crew descending below the minimum decision height.

See also
Japan Airlines Flight 471, another aviation disaster that took place at Palam International Airport less than a year prior to Indian Airlines Flight 440.

References

External links
Indian Airlines Flight 440 at Planecrashinfo.com

1973 in India
Aviation accidents and incidents in 1973
Airliner accidents and incidents caused by pilot error
Airliner accidents and incidents caused by weather
Aviation accidents and incidents in India
Accidents and incidents involving the Boeing 737 Original
440
May 1973 events in Asia